Louise Henry may refer to:

 Louise Henry Hoover (1874–1944), maiden name of the wife of Herbert Hoover and First Lady of the United States
 Louise Henry (actress) (1911–1967), American film actress